The vitamin D receptor (VDR also known as the calcitriol receptor) is a member of the nuclear receptor family of transcription factors.  Calcitriol (the active form of vitamin D, 1,25-(OH)2vitamin D3) binds to VDR, which then forms a heterodimer with the retinoid-X receptor. The VDR heterodimer then enters the nucleus and binds to Vitamin D responsive elements (VDRE) in genomic DNA. VDR binding results in expression or transrepression of many specific gene products. VDR is also involved in microRNA-directed post transcriptional mechanisms. In humans, the vitamin D receptor is encoded by the VDR gene located on chromosome 12q13.11.

VDR is expressed in most tissues of the body, and regulates transcription of genes involved in intestinal and renal transport of calcium and other minerals.  Glucocorticoids decrease VDR expression.  Many types of immune cells also express VDR.

Function 
The VDR gene encodes the nuclear hormone receptor for vitamin D. The most potent natural agonist is calcitriol and the vitamin D2 homologue ercalcitriol) is also a strong activator. Other forms of vitamin D bind with lower affinity, as does the secondary bile acid lithocholic acid. The receptor belongs to the family of trans-acting transcriptional regulatory factors and shows similarity of sequence to the steroid and thyroid hormone receptors.

Downstream targets of this nuclear hormone receptor include many genes involved in mineral metabolism. The receptor regulates a variety of other metabolic pathways, such as those involved in the immune response and cancer. 
VDR variants that bolster vitamin-D action and that are directly correlated with AIDS progression rates and VDR association with progression to AIDS follows an additive model. FokI polymorphism is a risk factor for enveloped virus infection as revealed in a meta-analysis. 
The importance of this gene has also been noted in the natural aging process were 3’UTR haplotypes of the gene showed an association with longevity.

Clinical relevance 
Mutations in this gene are associated with type II vitamin D-resistant rickets. A single nucleotide polymorphism in the initiation codon results in an alternate translation start site three codons downstream. Alternative splicing results in multiple transcript variants encoding the same protein. VDR gene variants seem to influence many biological endpoints, including those related to osteoporosis 

The vitamin D receptor plays an important role in regulating the hair cycle. Loss of VDR is associated with hair loss in experimental animals. Experimental studies have shown that the unliganded VDR interacts with regulatory regions in cWnt (wnt signaling pathway) and sonic hedgehog target genes and is required for the induction of these pathways during the postnatal hair cycle. These studies have revealed novel actions of the unliganded VDR in regulating the post-morphogenic hair cycle.

Researchers have focused their efforts in elucidating the role of VDR polymorphisms in different diseases and normal phenotypes such as the HIV-1 infection susceptibility and progression or the natural aging process. The most remarkable findings include the report of VDR variants that bolster vitamin-D action and that are directly correlated with AIDS progression rates, that VDR association with progression to AIDS follows an additive model and the role of FokI polymorphism as a risk factor for enveloped virus infection as revealed in a meta-analysis.

Interactions 

Vitamin D receptor has been shown to interact with many other factors which will affect transcription activation:

 BAG1,
 BAZ1B,
 CAV3,
 MED1,
 MED12,
 MED24,
 NCOR1,
 NCOR2, 
 NCOA2,
 RXRA, 
 RUNX1,
 RUNX1T1,
 SNW1,
 STAT1, and
 ZBTB16.

Interactive pathway map

References

Further reading

External links 
 
Nuclear Receptor Resource
Vitamin D Receptor: Molecule of the Month 
IUPHAR: Vitamin D receptor
 

Vitamin D
Intracellular receptors
Transcription factors